The England cricket team in Australia in 1884–85 was generally known as Alfred Shaw's XI after its main organiser. The team played 8 first-class matches, including the five matches in the Test series, winning 6 and losing 2.

Squads
The party comprised 13 players, all of them professionals: Arthur Shrewsbury, Billy Barnes, William Attewell, William Scotton, Wilfred Flowers and Alfred Shaw (all Nottinghamshire); Billy Bates, Joe Hunter, Bobby Peel and George Ulyett (all Yorkshire); Johnny Briggs (Lancashire); Maurice Read (Surrey); and James Lillywhite (Sussex).

Australia's team for the second Test showed eleven changes as a result of the 1884 touring team (who had contested the 1st Test) demanding fifty per cent of the gate money for this match. This ended Jack Blackham's run as a player in each of Australia's first 17 Test matches.

Matches

First Test

Second Test

Third Test

Fourth Test

Fifth Test

References

Bibliography
 Chris Harte, A History of Australian Cricket, Andre Deutsch, 1993
 Wisden Cricketers' Almanack 1886

1884 in Australian cricket
1884 in English cricket
1885 in Australian cricket
1885 in English cricket
1884
1884-85
International cricket competitions from 1844 to 1888
1884-85